This was a new event in the ITF Women's Circuit.

Ingrid Neel and Luisa Stefani won the title, defeating Alexandra Stevenson and Taylor Townsend in the final, 4–6, 6–4, [10–5].

Seeds

Draw

References 
 Draw

One Love Tennis Open - Doubles